Ninja III: The Domination is a 1984 American martial arts action horror film directed by Sam Firstenberg, and stars Sho Kosugi, Lucinda Dickey, Jordan Bennett, and James Hong. It is the third film in Cannon Films' Ninja Trilogy anthology series, the first being Enter the Ninja, and the second being Revenge of the Ninja. Like the previous films in the series, it has also garnered a cult following.

Plot
Christie Ryder (Dickey), a telephone linewoman and aerobics instructor, is possessed by the evil spirit of a fallen ninja warrior Hanjuro when coming to his aid. The spirit uses her body to carry out his revenge on the police officers who killed him. One of them is Billy Secord (Bennett), who catches Christie's eye yet cannot explain her preoccupation with Japanese culture nor help her with her sudden blackouts. Out of options, they turn to a Japanese exorcist Miyashima (Hong), who manages to summon the ninja within her. The exorcist reveals he cannot force the spirit out of Christie, but that "only a ninja can destroy a ninja". Christie and Billy are forced to seek the aid of Goro Yamada (Kosugi), a ninja hunting the assassin within her for killing his clan. The three force the ninja out in a dangerous gambit that results in the spirit repossessing his own dead body and fighting Yamada to a fight to the death, finally freeing all three of the curse of the black ninja.

Cast
 Sho Kosugi as Goro Yamada
 Lucinda Dickey as Christie Ryder
 Jordan Bennett as Billy Secord
 James Hong as Miyashima
 David Chung as Black Ninja Hanjuro
 Dale Ishimoto as Okuda
 John LaMotta as Case

Reception
On Rotten Tomatoes, the film holds an approval rating of 44% based on 9 reviews, with an average rating of 3.62/10. On Metacritic the film has a weighted average score of 25 out of 100, based on 7 critics, indicating "generally unfavorable reviews".

Home media
Scream Factory released the film in a Blu-ray/DVD combo pack on June 11, 2013.

The film was released on Blu-ray in the U.K. in 2016 by Eureka Video.

Scream Factory re-released the film in a Collector's Edition Blu-ray set on June 12, 2018 with a new transfer and additional supplemental materials.

See also
 List of American films of 1984
 List of martial arts films

References

External links
 
 
 
 

1984 films
1984 action films
1984 horror films
1980s action horror films
1984 martial arts films
1980s English-language films
Martial arts horror films
Golan-Globus films
American independent films
American martial arts films
American action horror films
Ninja films
Films directed by Sam Firstenberg
Japan in non-Japanese culture
Films produced by Menahem Golan
Films about spirit possession
Films produced by Yoram Globus
1980s American films